Brown Station is an census designated place in Prince George's County, Maryland, United States. Per the 2020 Census, the population was 3,298.

Demographics

2020 census

Note: the US Census treats Hispanic/Latino as an ethnic category. This table excludes Latinos from the racial categories and assigns them to a separate category. Hispanics/Latinos can be of any race.

References

Census-designated places in Prince George's County, Maryland
Census-designated places in Maryland